London Power Tunnels is a project by National Grid plc to reinforce the electricity transmission network in London, UK, by constructing more than 60 km of new deep-level tunnels carrying high-voltage cables.

The new network of tunnels replaces a series of ageing power cables, most of which were buried directly beneath roads. These were becoming unreliable, difficult to maintain without disrupting traffic, and were unable to meet future demand for electricity. The new tunnels allow the power cables to be upgraded and maintained without disruption to traffic and residents on the surface.

The project is divided into two phases: the first phase involved constructing tunnels connecting substations at Wimbledon, Hackney, and Willesden, and was completed in 2018. The second phase involves linking Wimbledon substation with Crayford, and is expected to be completed in 2026.

Phase 1 

The first phase involved constructing 32 km of tunnels linking substations from Wimbledon in the south west to Hackney in north east of London, at a cost of £1 . The 3–4 m diameter tunnels were dug by tunnel boring machines and run 20–60 m below street level. The tunnels were constructed by a joint venture between Costain Group and Skanska.

This phase linked Wimbledon and Hackney to substations at Willesden, St John's Wood, St Pancras, and Islington. It also involved the construction of two new substations at Seven Sisters Road in Highbury, and at Kensal Green, to feed traction power to Crossrail.

As well as the main  power transmission circuits for the National Grid, the tunnels also carry  circuits from Islington substation to St Pancras and Seven Sisters Road, forming part of the London power distribution network operated by UK Power Networks.

The project was started in February 2011 and the first section was energised five years later in February 2016. The project was officially opened by Prince Charles in February 2018.

Phase 2 
The second phase (known as LPT2) started in spring 2020 and will span 32.5 km from Wimbledon to Crayford in south-east London. The tunnels will be between 3–3.5 m in diameter, 10–63 m below street level, with most being around 30 m deep, and is expected to cost £750m.

The contract for the second phase was awarded to a joint venture between Murphy Group and Hochtief in December 2019. Construction on this phase started in May 2021.

This phase will link Wimbledon substation to existing substations at New Cross, Kidbrooke, and Hurst. Its access shafts will be at King's Avenue in Brixton and at Eltham. It is expected to be completed by October 2026.

See also 
 Elstree to St. John's Wood Cable Tunnel
 New Cross to Finsbury Market Cable Tunnel
 Lower Lea Valley Cable Tunnels

References

External links 
 Official Website

Tunnels in London
Electric power infrastructure in England
Electric power transmission in the United Kingdom
Tunnels underneath the River Thames